The Madonna and Child with Saints Michael the Archangel and Andrea is a Cima da Conegliano painting oil on panel (194x134 cm) dating from c. 1496–1498, and preserved at the Galleria nazionale di Parma.

History
Madonna and Child with Saints Michael the Archangel and Andrea was placed in Parma, in the old church of the Annunciation outside the city walls, which was demolished in 1546. In 1706, the painting entered the Sanvital collection as a work attributed to Leonardo da Vinci due to an apocryphal inscription in the bottom cartouche. In 1834, it was sold to the Ducal Gallery of Parma and was subsequently attributed to Cima da Conegliano.

Description

The panel represents the Virgin with the Baby Jesus. On the left, Michael stands with a lance and on the right, Andrew the Apostle carries a cross. The background depicts the town of Collalto. At right, ruined marble architecture is seen in silhouette, with pilasters sculpted in classical motifs forming the background of the Virgin and Child. The novel composition accentuates the dynamism of the scene, which is depicted with sharp definition in the details and landscape, all in a soft, golden light.

References

Bibliography

External links
 Opera sul sito della Galleria Nazionale di Parma

Paintings of the Madonna and Child by Cima da Conegliano
Paintings depicting Andrew the Apostle
Paintings depicting Michael (archangel)